Batakrushna Sahu is an Indian farmer from Odisha. He was conferred with Padma Shri in 2020 for his contribution in animal husbandry.

Biography
A farmer from Sarkana village of Khordha district, Sahoo started pisciculture in 1986. He trained many farmers in spawn production through traditional breeding methods. He did not get any financial help from the government. He also trained students of several colleges in Odisha.

Awards
Sahoo was conferred with Padma Shri in 2020 for his contribution in animal husbandry.

References

Living people
People from Khordha district
Recipients of the Padma Shri in other fields
Indian farmers
Year of birth missing (living people)